Bronius Kuzmickas (born 10 November 1935) is a Lithuanian politician and philosopher.  In 1990 he was among those who signed the Act of the Re-Establishment of the State of Lithuania.

References
Bibliography

1935 births
Living people
Lithuanian politicians
20th-century Lithuanian philosophers
Academic staff of Vilnius Gediminas Technical University